Play in Group D of the 1990 FIFA World Cup completed on 19 June 1990. West Germany won the group, and advanced to the second round, along with Yugoslavia and Colombia. The United Arab Emirates failed to advance.

Standings

Matches
All times local (CEST/UTC+2)

United Arab Emirates vs Colombia

West Germany vs Yugoslavia

Yugoslavia vs Colombia

West Germany vs United Arab Emirates

West Germany vs Colombia

Yugoslavia vs United Arab Emirates

1990 FIFA World Cup
Yugoslavia at the 1990 FIFA World Cup
United Arab Emirates at the 1990 FIFA World Cup
Colombia at the 1990 FIFA World Cup
West Germany at the 1990 FIFA World Cup